Mohammad Hassan Khan Sardar Iravani, originally Mohammad Hassan Khan Qajar-Ziyadlu 'Sardar-e Iravan', was a Qajar notable and political figure in 19th century Iran during the reign of Mohammad Shah Qajar and Nasser al-Din Shah Qajar.

Life
Born as the eldest son and heir of the formerly hereditary ruler of the khanate of Iravan, Mohammad Khan Qajar-Ziyadlu, from a cadet branch of the Qajar dynasty of Persia, Mohammad Hassan Khan moved from the Caucasus to Tehran, was married there to Princess Mahrokhsar Khanom "Fakhr od-Dowleh", daughter of the crown prince Abbas Mirza and sister of the future Mohammad Shah, and got important governmental posts.

Offspring
Abdulah Khan Iravani
Yusef Khan Sartip
Abdol Hossein Khan "Fakhr ol-Molk"
Abol Fath Khan "Sarem od-Dowleh"
Badie ol-Jamal Khanom I, married her maternal cousin Anoushiravan Mirza, eldest son of Bahman Mirza.

Sources
The Qajar dynasty pages: http://www.qajarpages.org/nassereddinchildren.html.

https://moderndiplomacy.eu/2020/08/02/the-treasure-map-to-the-forgotten-epoch-of-the-iravan-khanate/
19th-century Iranian politicians
Qajar princes